The  is a single-car electric multiple unit (EMU) train type introduced in 1986 by Japanese National Railways (JNR), and later operated by East Japan Railway Company (JR East), Central Japan Railway Company (JR Central), and West Japan Railway Company (JR-West).

Overview
The 123 series was created in 1986 from former KuMoNi 143 baggage cars which had become surplus to requirements. Some units were also converted from KuMoYuNi 147 postal cars (123-40 series, later 123-5000 series), and from KuMoYa 143 tractor cars (123-600 series).

Operations
As of 1 April 2012, one 123 series car (KuMoHa 123-1) is operated by JR East, based at Matsumoto Depot for use on the Chuo Main Line and Shinonoi Line. Five 123 series cars (KuMoHa 123-2 to 123-6) are operated by JR-West on the Ube Line, Onoda Line, and Sanyo Main Line.

Variants

KuMoHa 123-1
This car was converted from former baggage car KuMoNi 143-1 at Nagano Works in October 1986. It was re-liveried in March 1990 following conversion to wanman driver only operation.

KuMoHa 123-2 to 123-4
These three cars were converted in February 1987 at Hiroshima Works from former baggage cars KuMoNi 143-2, 143-3 and 143-6, respectively, originally for use on the Kabe Line. The two original pantographs were replaced with one PS16J lozenge-type pantograph at the No. 1 end.

KuMoHa 123-5 and 123-6
These two cars were converted in April 1987 at Suita Works from former baggage cars KuMoNi 143-7 and 143-8, respectively, originally for use on Hanwa Line branch services. The original pantographs at the No. 1 end were removed on conversion.

KuMoHa 123-41 to 123-45
These cars were converted from former post and baggage cars KuMoYuNi 147-1 to 147-5 in January 1987.

KuMoHa 123-601 and 123-602
These two cars were converted in March 1988 by JR Central at Hamamatsu Works from former tractor cars KuMoYa 143-601 and 143-602, respectively, for use on the Minobu Line. These cars had gangway doors at the ends, three sliding doors per side, and two pantographs. Inverter-controlled air-conditioning was added in December 1988.

KuMoHa 123-5041 to 123-5045
These cars were modified in June 1989 at Hamamatsu Works by JR Central from earlier KuMoHa 123-40 series cars, with the addition of inverter-controlled air-conditioning.

KuMoHa 123-5145
These cars were modified by JR Central from earlier KuMoHa 123-5045 , for use on wanman driver only operation services on the Minobu Line. Gangway doors were also added on conversion.

History
The last remaining 123 series car operated by JR East was withdrawn from the start of the revised timetable on 15 March 2013, with operations replaced by E127 series two-car EMUs.

References

External links

 JR East 123 series 

Electric multiple units of Japan
East Japan Railway Company
Central Japan Railway Company
West Japan Railway Company
Train-related introductions in 1986